John Casimir, Count Palatine of Zweibrücken-Kleeburg (20 April 1589, Zweibrücken – 18 June 1652, Stegeborg Castle) was the son of John I, Count Palatine of Zweibrücken and his wife, Duchess Magdalene of Jülich-Cleves-Berg. He was married to Catherine of Sweden and was the founder of a branch of Wittelsbach Counts Palatine often called the Swedish line, because it gave rise to three subsequent kings of Sweden, but more commonly known as the Kleeburg (or Cleebourg) line.

In 1591 his father stipulated that, as the youngest son, John Casimir would receive as appanage the countship of Neukastell in the Palatinate. Upon their father's death in 1611, however, the eldest son, John II, Count Palatine of Zweibrucken, instead signed a compromise with John Casimir whereby the latter received only the castle at Neukastell coupled with an annuity of 3000 florins from the countship's revenues (similarly, John Casimir's elder brother, Frederick Casimir, received the castle at Landsberg with a small surrounding domain, instead of the entire Landsberg appanage bequeathed to him paternally).  
   
On 11 June 1615, Casimir married his second cousin Catherine of Sweden, and their son eventually became King Charles X of Sweden.

Family 
Five of his children with Catherine survived infancy:

 Christina Magdalena (1616–1662); married Frederick VI, Margrave of Baden-Durlach. King Adolf Frederick of Sweden was her great-grandson.
 King Charles X Gustav of Sweden (1622–1660).
 Maria Eufrosyne (1625–1687); married Count Magnus Gabriel De la Gardie.
 Eleonora Catherine (1626–1692); married Frederick, Landgrave of Hesse-Eschwege. 
 Adolf John (1629–1689).

Ancestors

References

1589 births
John Casimir
1652 deaths
John 1615
People from Zweibrücken
John Casimir
Lord High Treasurers of Sweden
Dukes of Stegeborg
Court of Christina, Queen of Sweden